Sook may refer to:
Sook, Sabah, a small town in Interior Division, Sabah, Malaysia
Sook (state constituency), Sabah, Malaysia
Sook, New Ireland, Papua New Guinea
Sook Kalan, a village in District Gujrat, Punjab, Pakistan
Sook (Korean name), given name (including a list of people with the name)
The Chesapeake Bay waterman's term for the female of the blue crab, Callinectes sapidus (males are jimmies)
Söök or Seok, a clan among the Turkic-speaking people

People
Ryan Sook, American comic book artist

See also
Suk (disambiguation)
Souk, Arabic term for a marketplace
Sooke, British Columbia